Vladislav Evseev (born 10 September 1984) is a Russian professional ice hockey player who currently plays for Vityaz Chekhov of the KHL. Evseev was selected by the Boston Bruins in the 2nd round (56th overall) of the 2002 NHL Entry Draft.

Career statistics

Regular season and playoffs

International

References

External links 

1984 births
Boston Bruins draft picks
Living people
Russian ice hockey left wingers
Ice hockey people from Moscow
HC Vityaz players
HC CSKA Moscow players
HC Dynamo Moscow players
Rubin Tyumen players
Salavat Yulaev Ufa players
Severstal Cherepovets players